A class act is a performance or personal trait or behavior that is distinctive and of high quality.  As a noun phrase, it is typically used to refer to a single person, a team – such as a performing artists working together – or an organization.

Usage and contemporary etymology

In sports 
In sports, a "class act" would be an athlete who not only performs exceptionally well, but also exhibits a range of other admirable qualities, on and off the field.

In dance 
In dance during the jazz age and the swing era (the first half of the 20th century) – tap dance in particular – a class act was, and still is, a complimentary reference to a dance team that exhibits precision, elegant dress, detached coolness, flawless execution, and dignity. In 1946, after serving in the Army, Charles "Honi" Coles and Cholly Atkins collaborated as a dance duo that became highly acclaimed.  British dance critic Edward Thorpe, in his 1989 book, Black Dance, described Coles and Atkins as 

For black dancers of the jazz age and the swing era, the noun phrase, "class act," had a more nuanced meaning.  According to Cholly Atkins, some performers and managers harbored stereotypical preferences of how black male dancers and musical comedy dance teams should dress and perform.  To those performers and managers, a class act was more apropos for white male entertainers.  Black entertainers who did it were likely to be perceived as defiant. Atkins, in his 2001 book, Class Act (co-authored with Jacqui Malone), stated that,

Against the backdrop of dance teams working in the blackface tradition, Atkins was one in a long list of virtuoso black male dance artists who rejected the minstrel show stereotypes of the grinning-and-dancing clowns  lazy, incompetent fools  and dandies who thought only of flashy clothes, flirtatious courting, new dances, and good looks. Atkins' and his peers aspired to pure artistic expression driven by a desire for respectability and equality on the American concert stage.

Class act syles, in tap 
Marshall Stearns, in the 1964 film-made-for-TV, Over the Top to Bebop, stated that the class act "started with the soft-shoe and the sand and the shuffle; and it grew up and became a dance in which you showed elegance and dignity and precision. And every class act in the thirties and forties had their own soft-shoe."

Selected "class acts"

In tap dance 
 The Cotton Club Boys, from 1934 to 1940, were the Cotton Club's stock class act dance troupe
 John "Bubbles" Sublett and Ford "Buck" Washington
 Cholly Atkins and Honi Coles
 Willie Covan and Leonard Ruffin
 Eddie Sledge and Fred Davis (aka Fred and Sledge)
 Charles Cook and Ernest Brown
 Eddie Rector (1890–1962)
 Dickie Wells, Jimmy Mordecai, Earnest Taylor
 Nicholas brothers
 Gary Lambert "Pete" Nugent (1909–1973), Irving "Peaches" Beamon (born 1911), Duke Miller (1910–1937)

In vaudeville 
 Rosamond Johnson and Bob Cole, vaudeville duo that began in 1902

Contrasting noun phrase 
A "flash act," in tap dance, includes acrobatic movements.  The Nicholas brothers, who famously performed class acts, also did flash acts.

References 

Dance terminology